Glutathionuria is the presence of glutathione in the urine, and is a rare inborn error of metabolism.

The condition has been identified in five patients.

References

External links 

Eicosanoid metabolism disorders